Vilnius International French Lyceum  ( or LIFV) is a French international school in Vilnius, Lithuania. It has preschool through senior high school levels. It has a preschool and grade 1 building and a building with all other grades. It is affiliated with the Agency for French Education Abroad (AEFE).

It was formerly known as the Ecole Française de Vilnius.

History
It was established in 1992. The initial group of students had diplomats as parents. In 2012 the school had 207 students, with Lithuanians making up over 50%. By 2021 the enrollment count was 550. The current facility opened in 2021.

See also
 Vilnius International School

References

External links
 Vilnius International French Lyceum

French international schools in Europe
Schools in Vilnius
France–Lithuania relations
Educational institutions established in 1992
1992 establishments in Lithuania